Ambrose McCarthy Patterson (29 June 1877 – 26 December 1966) was a painter and printmaker.

Life
Patterson was born in Daylesford, Victoria. He studied at the Melbourne Art School under E. Phillips Fox and Tudor St. George Tucker, at the National Gallery Art School in Melbourne and continued his studies in Paris at the Académie Colarossi and the Académie Julian under Lucien Simon, André Lhote and Maxime Maufra. In Paris he became a friend of compatriot Nellie Melba, the famous soprano; Patterson's brother, Tom, was married to Melba's sister, Belle. Through Melba's influence, he was able to continue his studies with John Singer Sargent. He became part of the Paris arts scene and exhibited at the first Salon d'Automne exhibitions. He had five paintings at the 1905 Paris Salon at which Henri Matisse and the fauves stunned the art world.

He arrived in Hawaii in 1916 on a stopover from Sidney to New York, and decided to stay with a Parisian friend living in Honolulu.  During the next 18 months, Patterson made block prints and paintings with particular interest in Kilauea.  His art was included in the Hawaiian Society of Artists Annual in 1917.  He left for California in 1918 and settled in Seattle.  At the 1918 Spring Annual of the San Francisco Art Association (SFAA) his wood block prints were said to be "especially fine in color."  That summer his art was given a one-man exhibition at the SFAA galleries and he contributed three color prints (The Steeple Chase, The Bull Fight, and The Long Beach) to the Seventh Annual of the California Society of Etchers.

By September 1918 Patterson had moved to Seattle to work as a freelance artist, perhaps being the first modern artist in that city, and that fall his art was given a solo show at the Seattle Fine Arts Society, the first of many exhibitions in Washington State. In 1919 he established the University of Washington School of Painting and Design. Patterson married painter and former student Viola Hansen in 1922, and the two became major figures of the arts in the Pacific Northwest region. Patterson taught until his retirement in 1947.  He died in Seattle in 1966 leaving behind an impressive record of awards received and exhibitions across the United States, including the: Art Institute of Chicago, Museum of Modern Art in New York City, National Gallery of Art in Washington, D.C., and the World's Fairs in San Francisco and New York City.

The Art Gallery of New South Wales (Sydney, Australia), the Honolulu Museum of Art, the National Portrait Gallery (Australia) (Canberra), the Philadelphia Museum of Art, the Seattle Art Museum and the Tacoma Art Museum are among the public collections holding works by Ambrose McCarthy Patterson.

Gallery

References

 Alexander, Jane, Portrait of an Artist: Ambrose Patterson (1877–1966) From the Latin Quarter to the pot pourri of Palamadom, Jimaringle Publications, Melbourne, Australia, 1992.
 Congdon-Martin, Douglas, Aloha Spirit, Hawaiian Art and Popular Design, Schiffer Publishing, Atglen, PA, 1998, p. 179
 Hughes, Glenn (Editor), Hawaii, Twelve Woodcuts by Ambrose Patterson, Seattle, University of Washington Book Store, 1928.
 Knapp, Danielle Marie, Rethinking Ambrose Patterson and Modern Art in Seattle, MA thesis, University of Oregon, June 2010

1877 births
1966 deaths
20th-century American painters
American male painters
Australian painters
University of Washington faculty
Artists from Seattle
Volcano School painters
Hawaii artists
Works Progress Administration workers
Northwest School (art)
Australian emigrants to the United States
People of the New Deal arts projects
People from Daylesford, Victoria
Académie Colarossi alumni
20th-century American male artists
National Gallery of Victoria Art School alumni